The 1978–79 FA Cup was the 98th staging of the world's oldest football knockout competition, The Football Association Challenge Cup, or FA Cup. The final saw Arsenal beat Manchester United 3–2, three of the five goals being scored in the last five minutes.

First round proper

Teams from the Football League Third and Fourth Division entered in this round plus Altrincham, Leatherhead, Scarborough and Wycombe Wanderers were given byes. The first round of games were played on 25 November 1978. Replays were played mainly on 28–29 November, with two on 5–6 December.

Second round proper
The second round of games were played on 16 December 1978. Replays took place mainly on 18–19 with one on 28 December and another on 9 January 1979.

Third round proper
Teams from the Football League First and Second Division entered in this round. The third round of games in the FA Cup were intended to be played on 6 January 1979, but only four games were actually played on this date. Twenty more ties were played midweek over 8–10 January with a few more taking place on 15–16 and one on 18 January. Replays were intended for 9–10 January but again took place at various times.  One tie, between Wrexham and Stockport County, suffered six postponements before finally being played on 1 February, by which time Arsenal and Sheffield Wednesday had played five times, the tie needing a fourth replay before being settled..

Fourth round proper
The fourth round of games were intended to be played over the weekend 26–27 January 1979, but by this time only eight matches had been played, of which three went to replays. The other games were completed either midweek on 29–31st, or on 5 or 12 February. Replays were played at various times after the initial games.

Fifth round proper
The fifth set of games were played on either 20, 26 or 28 February, or 10 March 1979. Two replays were played on 26 February and 12 March.

Sixth round proper
The sixth round of FA Cup games were played on 10 March 1979, except for the Southampton–Arsenal match which began on 19 March. Holders Ipswich Town were eliminated by Liverpool. There were three replays.

Semi finals

Replay

Final

Television Coverage
The right to show FA Cup games were, as with Football League matches, shared between the BBC and ITV network. All games were shown in a highlights format, except the Final, which was shown live both on BBC1 & ITV. The BBC football highlights programme Match of the Day would show up to three games and the various ITV regional network stations would cover up to one game and show highlights from other games covered elsewhere on the ITV network. No games from Rounds 1 or 2 were shown. Occasional highlights of replays would be shown on either the BBC or ITV.

These matches were.

1Footage available on YouTube
2featured on Sportsnight
3featured on Midweek Sports Special

References

External links
 FA Cup Results Archive

 
FA Cup seasons
Fa
Eng